The Chief Scientific Adviser to the UK's Ministry of Defence is responsible for providing strategic management of science and technology issues in the MOD, most directly through the MOD research budget of well over £1 billion, and sits as a full member of the Defence Management Board and the Defence Council, the two most senior management boards within the MOD. There is also a Chief Scientific Adviser (Nuclear), responsible for the MOD’s nuclear science and technology programme, currently held by Professor Robin Grimes.

List of MOD Chief Scientific Advisers 
 Sir Henry Tizard, 1946–1952
 Sir John Cockcroft, 1952–1954
 Sir Frederick Brundrett, 1954–1960
 Sir Solly Zuckerman, 1960–1965
 Sir Alan Cottrell, 1966–1967
 Sir William Cook, 1966–1970
 Sir Hermann Bondi, 1971–1977
 Sir Ronald Mason, 1977–1983
 Sir Richard Oswald Chandler Norman, 1983–1988
 Sir Ronald Oxburgh, 1988–1993
 Sir David Davies, 1993–1999
 Sir Keith O'Nions, 2000–2004
 Sir Roy Anderson, 2004–2008
 Sir Mark Welland, 2008–2012
 Vernon Gibson, 2012–2016
 Hugh F. Durrant-Whyte, 2017–2018
 Simon Cholerton, 2018–2019 (interim)
 Dame Angela McLean, since 2019

See also
 Frederick Lindemann, 1st Viscount Cherwell

Notes

External links 
 MOD Defence Science and Technology

Ministry of Defence (United Kingdom)
Science and technology in the United Kingdom
Chief scientific advisers by country